The Buckhead Grand building is a 137.5-meter (451.115-feet) tall skyscraper in Buckhead, Atlanta, Georgia. The 36-story residential building, designed by Smallwood, Reynolds, Stewart, Stewart & Associates, Inc., was constructed starting in 2003 and finishing in mid-2004.

Education 
The building is zoned to North Atlanta High School of the Atlanta Public Schools.

External links
 Buckhead Grand Official Site
 Buckhead Grand Condos

Residential buildings completed in 2004
Residential skyscrapers in Atlanta
Residential condominiums in the United States